The second season of the television series Buffy the Vampire Slayer premiered on September 15, 1997 on The WB and concluded its 22-episode season on May 19, 1998. The first 13 episodes aired on Mondays at 9:00 pm ET, beginning with episode 14 the series moved to Tuesdays at 8:00 pm ET, a timeslot the series would occupy for the rest of its run.

New vampires Spike and Drusilla come to town along with the new slayer, Kendra Young, who was activated as a result of Buffy's brief death in the season one finale. Xander becomes involved with Cordelia, while Willow becomes involved with witchcraft and Daniel "Oz" Osbourne, who becomes a werewolf after being bitten by a young cousin who (he later learns) has the same condition. Buffy and the vampire Angel develop a relationship over the course of the season, but Angel's dark past as the evil and sadistic Angelus threatens to destroy Buffy and the world.

Plot 
Buffy Summers (Sarah Michelle Gellar) returns from a summer in Los Angeles after her death at the end of the first season. After distancing herself from her friends and loved ones with her new, self-centered attitude that almost gets them killed, Buffy comes to terms with the traumatic events that transpired and crushes the bones of The Master (Mark Metcalf) once and for all, much to the annoyance of The Anointed One (Andrew J. Ferchland). A few weeks later two new vampires come to town—Spike (James Marsters) and a weakened Drusilla (Juliet Landau)—who intend to use the blood of Drusilla's sire, Buffy's new boyfriend and ensouled vampire Angel (David Boreanaz), to restore her to full health when the time is right. Impatient with the ritualistic attitude of the Order of Aurelius, Spike kills the Anointed One and becomes the more informal leader of Sunnydale's vampire society.

Meanwhile, love is in the air for the members of the Scooby Gang as Buffy and Angel fall deeply in love, Xander Harris (Nicholas Brendon) and Cordelia Chase (Charisma Carpenter) begin an unlikely relationship, Willow Rosenberg (Alyson Hannigan) finds romance in the form of guitarist Daniel "Oz" Osbourne (Seth Green) and even Rupert Giles (Anthony Stewart Head) begins to further his relationship with computer science teacher turned techno-pagan Jenny Calendar (Robia LaMorte). Although after a visit by Giles' long lost friend Ethan Rayne (Robin Sachs) and the return of a powerful demon they used to worship in their youth, Jenny distances herself from Giles because she fears the dangerous life he leads. In "What's My Line" the time has come for Drusilla's ritual. Angel is captured by Spike after he summons a horde of bounty hunters called the Order of Taraka to attempt to eliminate Buffy. Meanwhile, a new Slayer shows up in town, Kendra (Bianca Lawson), who appears to be of Caribbean origin, sent to Sunnydale by her Watcher under the pretense of a very dark power rising up at the Hellmouth. Buffy and Kendra are forced to work together in order to rescue Angel and stop Spike's plan. Although they do save Angel's life and stop the Order, Drusilla is still returned to full strength while Spike is seriously injured by Buffy's assault. Kendra returns to her home as Buffy reaches a new appreciation for her destiny as a slayer.

During Buffy's 17th birthday, Drusilla and Spike resurrect a powerful demon called "The Judge" (Brian Thompson) who can burn the humanity out of people and who claims to be invincible. After Buffy and Angel escape from his attack, the two finally consummate their relationship which brings Angel "a moment of perfect happiness" and ends up costing him his soul. Buffy wakes up in Angel's bed the following morning alone and frets about his disappearance. Later she returns to his apartment where he torments her about giving up her virginity to him. Buffy is left emotionally devastated and suffers further betrayal after she learns that Jenny Calendar is of Romani origin and was sent to Sunnydale in order to prevent Angel from losing his soul, a mission in which she failed. Angel, now Angelus, joins forces with Spike and Drusilla as they intend to use the judge to wipe humanity off the Earth. The Scooby Gang show up to stop them and Buffy uses a rocket launcher to kill the judge and halt the vampire's plan. She then fights one on one with Angel for the first time but cannot kill him. Instead she forcibly kicks him in the testicles and leaves. Meanwhile, Willow finds out about Xander and Cordelia's relationship and falls out with Xander as a result, while Giles' relationship with Jenny is shattered due to her betrayal.

Over the next few months, Buffy readies herself for the day when she will finally have to slay Angelus and is given further incentive after Angelus murders Jenny Calendar soon after she figures out the incantation needed to restore Angel's soul. Giles is left emotionally shattered having just mended the relationship between him and Jenny and is traumatized when he finds her lifeless body in his bed, a gift left by Angelus. He attempts to take his revenge on Angelus but is saved by Buffy who claims she can't fight her mission on her own. Meanwhile, Xander and Cordelia, and Willow and Oz, now a werewolf after being bitten by his young cousin, officially begin dating and both Cordy and Oz become genuine members of the Scooby Gang. Willow also begins teaching Ms. Calendar's computer science class due to her extremely high aptitude and subsequently becomes interested in Jenny's notes and websites devoted to magic while Spike becomes increasingly jealous over Angelus and Drusilla's apparently sexual relationship while he is left unable to walk. In "I Only Have Eyes For You" it turns out that Spike is in fact ambulatory and that he is hatching a plan of his own to take his revenge on Angelus and win Drusilla back. 

During the season finale, Buffy and Willow come across the spell Jenny was working on just prior to her death. While they deliberate on what is to be done, Kendra returns to Sunnydale by word of her watcher who claims that a dark power is once again rising at the Hellmouth. This power turns out to be the stone statue of the powerful demon Acathla who, once upon a time, attempted to swallow the world into Hell. Angelus hatches a plan to awaken Acathla once again and destroy the world. After he fails to awaken the demon however, Angelus sends a team led by Drusilla to kidnap Giles while he calls Buffy out to distract her. As Giles is taken away, Willow is left comatose, Xander's arm is broken and Drusilla kills Kendra. Buffy returns to the library to find the police waiting for her. She flees their attack and makes it to the hospital to find her friends. When no one can find Giles, she goes to his house where she finds a demon named Whistler (Max Perlich). He tells her that what happened with Acathla wasn't meant to go the way it did — Angel is in fact the key that will re-open Acathla but the Powers that Be thought that Angel's destiny was to stop him. Drusilla uses her psychic powers to trick Giles into giving Angelus this information after Angelus sadistically tortured the watcher. Meanwhile, Willow awakens from her coma after a proclamation of love from best friend Xander and adamantly decides to try to perform the ritual of restoration to return Angel's soul. Spike joins forces with Buffy to help take down Angelus while Buffy's mom, Joyce Summers (Kristine Sutherland), finally figures out the truth about her destined daughter. As Buffy leaves to retrieve a mystical sword brought to Sunnydale by Kendra, Joyce tells Buffy never to come back. Sunnydale High School Principal Snyder (Armin Shimerman) expels Buffy from Sunnydale High. With nothing left, Buffy storms Angelus' mansion while Xander aids a weakened Giles. Buffy is too late, even with Spike's help (who takes Drusilla out of the fray). Angelus uses his blood to reawaken Acathla. As Buffy and Angelus compete in an epic sword fight, Acathla begins to swallow the earth. Meanwhile, Willow successfully performs the powerful spell after she is overcome by an unknown mystical energy. As Angel's soul is returned, Buffy has one chance to save the world and, after kissing him and proclaiming that she loves him, runs the magical sword through Angel's chest, who is then swallowed by the portal, closing it for good. Left utterly devastated, Buffy flees Sunnydale.

Cast and characters

Main cast 
 Sarah Michelle Gellar as Buffy Summers
 Nicholas Brendon as Xander Harris
 Alyson Hannigan as Willow Rosenberg
 Charisma Carpenter as Cordelia Chase
 David Boreanaz as Angel
 Anthony Stewart Head as Rupert Giles

Recurring cast

Guest cast 
 Elizabeth Anne Allen as Amy Madison
 Julie Benz as Darla
 Julia Lee as Chanterelle
 Mark Metcalf as The Master
 John Ritter as Ted Buchanan

Production and crew 
Series creator Joss Whedon served as executive producer and showrunner. Besides Whedon, only David Greenwalt and Rob Des Hotel & Dean Batali, now executive story editors, returned. Whedon wrote the most episodes, writing five by himself and co-writing one with co-executive producer David Greenwalt, and doing another story with Greenwalt, totaling seven episodes. Marti Noxon joined as a staff writer (promoted to story editor midseason) and wrote the next highest number of episodes, writing five on her own and co-writing one with Howard Gordon, who joined as consulting producer for the first half of the season. Greenwalt devised the story for "School Hard" with Whedon, but wrote the teleplay solo. The season was shot through 1997. Greenwalt wrote and directed "Ted" with Whedon as well. Rob Des Hotel and Dean Batali (returning from the first season) wrote three episodes together. Freelance writer Carl Ellsworth was fired following his first episode "Halloween". David Tyron King wrote two freelance episodes (as Ty King), King was previously an executive producer on the previous series Whedon worked on, Parenthood (1990). Former story editors Matt Kiene and Joe Reinkemeyer returned and wrote one freelance episode. The other freelanced script of the season was "Go Fish", wrote by husband and wife team David Fury and Elin Hampton, Fury would continue to write freelance in the following season before joining the show full-time.

Both Joss Whedon and Bruce Seth Green directed the highest number of episodes in the second season, directing five episodes each. Later regular directors on the series, David Solomon (also co-producer) and James A. Contner directed their first episodes in the second season.

Episodes 

<onlyinclude>{{Episode table |background=#A41C1E |overall=5 |season=5 |title=20 |director=13 |writer=26 |airdate=15 |prodcode=6 |viewers=10 |country=U.S. |episodes=

{{Episode list/sublist|Buffy the Vampire Slayer (season 2)
 |EpisodeNumber = 30
 |EpisodeNumber2 = 18
 |Title = Killed by Death
 |DirectedBy = Deran Sarafian
 |WrittenBy = Rob Des Hotel & Dean Batali
 |OriginalAirDate = 
 |ProdCode = 5V18
 |ShortSummary = Buffy falls ill from flu, collapsing during a fight with Angelus, and is taken to hospital. In an apparent dream, she sees a boy outside her room, followed by a demonic figure. When Buffy wakes, she overhears a conversation about experimental treatments, and finds the boy, Ryan, who warns her that "Death" visits the hospital regularly. She enlists the help of her friends to investigate. They learn that Dr. Backer, who works at the hospital, has a history of controversial experimentation on children. Later, Buffy watches Dr. Backer attacked and killed by the demon, although she can no longer see it. Cordelia and Giles learn that the demon is called Kindestod (German for "the child's death"), while Buffy and Willow learn that Dr. Backer's treatment was working on the children. Realizing that Kindestod is only visible to the sick, Buffy re-infects herself. She finds all the children gone, and sees Kindestod heading to the basement. Kindestod attacks Ryan there, but Buffy intervenes while Xander rescues the children. After a fight, Buffy breaks Kindestod'''s neck.
|Viewers=6.08

 |LineColor = A41C1E
}}

}}</onlyinclude>

 Reception 
Rotten Tomatoes reported an approval rating of 91% with an average score of 7.45/10, based on 11 reviews. The website's critics consensus reads, "Buffy finds its footing in season two, crafting a season that balances supernatural hauntings and high school happenings with ease."

The two-part episode "Surprise"/"Innocence" won an Emmy Award for Outstanding Makeup for a Series. Christophe Beck won a Primetime Emmy Award for Outstanding Music Composition for a Series for "Becoming (Part 1)". The season finale, "Becoming (Parts 1 & 2)", was also nominated for a Primetime Emmy Award for Outstanding Hairstyling for a Series. 
	
The second season is included on Pajiba.com's list of the best 20 seasons of the past 20 years.

 DVD release Buffy the Vampire Slayer: The Complete Second Season was released on DVD in region 1 on June 11, 2002 and in region 2 on May 21, 2001. The DVD includes all 22 episodes on 6 discs presented in full frame 1.33:1 aspect ratio. Special features on the DVD include four commentary tracks—"Reptile Boy" by writer and director David Greenwalt, "What's My Line" (Part 1 & 2) by co-writer Marti Noxon and "Innocence" by writer and director Joss Whedon. Whedon also discusses the episodes "Surprise", "Innocence", "Passion", "I Only Have Eyes For You" and "Becoming" in interviews. Scripts for "Reptile Boy", "What's My Line" (Parts 1 & 2) and "Innocence" are included. Featurettes include "Designing Buffy", a 15-minute featurette which details the set designs; "A Buffy'' Bestiary", a 30-minute featurette detailing the monsters featured in the season; and "Beauty and Beasts", a 20-minute featurette showcasing the make-up process. Also included are cast biographies, photo galleries, and series trailers.

Notes

References

External links 
 
 List of Buffy the Vampire Slayer season 2 episodes at BuffyGuide.com
 

 
1997 American television seasons
1998 American television seasons